Vulpoxena separabilis is a species of moth of the family Tortricidae. It is found in Peru.

The wingspan is about 20 mm. The ground colour of the forewings is cream with brownish suffusions and veins in the posterior third of wing. The costa and markings are rust brown. The hindwings are yellowish cream, tinged with brownish at the apex.

Etymology
The species name refers to the possibility of separation of this species from its congeners and is derived from Latin separabilis (meaning separation).

References

Moths described in 2010
Euliini